"The Curly Shuffle" is a novelty song written by Chicago based singer and musician Peter Quinn as an homage to The Three Stooges film comedy team.  It was initially recorded by Quinn's group Jump 'n the Saddle Band, and first released in late 1983.  The timing of the recording nearly coincided with The Three Stooges receiving their star on the Hollywood Walk of Fame on August 30, 1983.  This recording made #15 on the US Billboard charts in early 1984.

In Canada, the song was simultaneously released by The Knuckleheads on Attic Records, while Jump 'n the Saddle's version was also available.  The Knuckleheads' version was the hit in Canada, reaching #29 on the Canadian RPM charts.

In Australia, both versions were issued, and both were minor chart hits.

Jump N' the Saddle version
The song had the band's lead vocalist Peter Quinn mimicking many of Curly Howard's catch phrases. Issued independently in mid-1983, "The Curly Shuffle" was picked up by Atlantic Records in November, and was distinctive enough to climb to number 15 on the Billboard Hot 100 in early 1984.  The group never managed to produce another hit, issuing only one further single ("It Should've Been Me") before splitting up.

Music video
A promotional video was made using clips from various Three Stooges short films. The video was regularly shown on the Diamond Vision screen of the New York Mets at Shea Stadium in the mid-1980s, and became part of the fan experience. Additionally, it was included as a bonus feature on one of the 1984 Stooges compilation videos released by RCA Columbia Pictures Home Video.

Clips from the following Stooges shorts were used:

An Ache in Every Stake, A Bird in the Head, Calling All Curs, Cash and Carry, Disorder in the Court, Dizzy Detectives, Dizzy Pilots, Dopey Dicks, Dutiful But Dumb, The Ghost Talks, Healthy, Wealthy, and Dumb, Micro-Phonies, No Census, No Feeling, Pardon My Scotch, A Plumbing We Will Go, Pop Goes the Easel, Punch Drunks, Some More of Samoa, Studio Stoops, Tassels in the Air, Three Little Beers, Three Missing Links, Three Sappy People, Uncivil Warriors, Violent is the Word for Curly, and Woman Haters. Instead of showing clips with Joe Besser, brief glimpses of Curly Joe DeRita and Shemp Howard were used.

Chart performance

References

External links
 The Mad Music Archive - Details about the song, including its writer, producer, and chart position

1983 debut singles
1983 songs
Novelty songs
Atlantic Records singles
Songs about dancing
Songs about actors
Songs about comedians
Novelty and fad dances
Cultural depictions of The Three Stooges